Viktor Petrovich Taranovsky (Russian: Ви́ктор Петро́вич Тарано́вский) (12 October 1864 – 7 January 1937) was a Russian Major General of the First World War.  He served in the Lithuanian Life Guards Regiment of the Russian Imperial Guard and from 1916 commanded the Russian division on the Macedonian front.  After the October Revolution his division was largely interned, though some volunteered to fight on the French front.  Taranovsky remained in France as a white émigré serving on veterans committees and as assistant rector at the Alexander Nevsky Cathedral, Paris.

Early career 
Taranovsky was born on 12 October 1864.  He was the second husband of O.F. Taranovskaya and father to P.V. Taranovsky.  Taranovsky was a graduate of the Kiev Cadet Corps and the Alexander Military School in Moscow.  He rose to become Major General of the Lithuanian Life Guards Regiment of the Russian Imperial Guard.

First World War 
Taranovsky commanded the Russian division on the Macedonian front from 1916.  Prince Andrei Lobanov-Rostovsky recalled the general's "sharp keen eyes" when meeting him upon first being posted to the division in 1917.  After the October Revolution and into the new year discipline in the division broke down and it was interned by the French army at Veria.  The men were given the choice, by Taranovsky, of continuing to fight, serving as labourers or being imprisoned in Southern Algeria.  Most of the division's officers decided to continue to fight (an 800-man unit of the Russian Legion was formed to fight in France) but the majority of the men refused and chose imprisonment.  During the war Taranovsky received the Saint George Sword (formerly the Golden Weapon for Bravery).

Later life 
After the war Taranovsky lived in exile as a white émigré in Nice and then Paris, France.  He was chairman of his regimental association and of the Union of Officers of the French Front, for whom he started, in 1934, the tradition of a pilgrimage to the Camp de Châlons in Mourmelon-le-Grand, former base of the Russian Legion.  Taranovsky was also honorary chairman of a committee to establish a monument at the Russian war cemetery in Saint-Hilaire-le-Grand, this was built in 1937.  He also served as assistant rector at the Alexander Nevsky Cathedral, Paris.  He died at Reims on 7 January 1937.

References

Bibliography 

1864 births
1937 deaths
Russian Imperial Guard officers
Russian generals
Russian military personnel of World War I
White Russian emigrants to France
Recipients of the Gold Sword for Bravery
Russian untitled nobility